Straw Hat Pizza is a chain of pizza restaurants founded in 1959 in San Leandro, California.

History
Straw Hat Pizza was founded in 1959 by Charlie Olson and Bill Henderlong. At one point there were 230 locations across California and Nevada.

Locations
As of June 2022, the company's website lists 29 locations spread across California.

See also
 List of pizza chains of the United States

References

External links
 Straw Hat Pizza company history

Pizza chains of the United States
Restaurants in California
Companies based in San Leandro, California
American companies established in 1959
Restaurants established in 1959
1959 establishments in California
Food and drink in the San Francisco Bay Area